Cai Shangyan (born 25 September 1962) is a Chinese long-distance runner. He competed in the men's marathon at the 1988 Summer Olympics. He is from Qingdao.

References

1962 births
Living people
Athletes (track and field) at the 1988 Summer Olympics
Chinese male long-distance runners
Chinese male marathon runners
Olympic athletes of China
Place of birth missing (living people)
Athletes from Qingdao